Are Tronseth (born 3 September 1981 in Trondheim) is a former Norwegian football defender.

He grew up in local club Remyra IL. He moved to Stjørdals-Blink while still a youth player.

In 1997 he played for Stjørdals-Blink's senior team. He later joined Rosenborg. In 2003, he was loaned out to Ham Kam, a move which was made permanent ahead of the 2004 season as the club won promotion. This year he played 14 Norwegian Premier League games. He was later loaned out from Ham Kam to Hønefoss in 2005, Fredrikstad in 2006 and Sarpsborg Sparta in 2007.

From 2020 he is a coach in Ranheim.

Career statistics

References

100% Fotball player statistics

External links 
 

1981 births
Living people
Footballers from Trondheim
People from Stjørdal
Norwegian footballers
IL Stjørdals-Blink players
Rosenborg BK players
Hamarkameratene players
Hønefoss BK players
Fredrikstad FK players
Sarpsborg 08 FF players
FK Haugesund players
Ranheim Fotball players
Norwegian First Division players
Eliteserien players
Association football defenders
Norway under-21 international footballers